The 2004 XXXX FIBA International Christmas Tournament "Trofeo Raimundo Saporta-Memorial Fernando Martín" was such written because the 40th edition (XLth in roman numbers and here XXXXth in old roman numbers perhaps more graphical), of the FIBA International Christmas Tournament, between a former XXXIXth one in 2003 and the following  XXXXIst tournament in 2006. This one took place at Palacio Vistalegre, Madrid, Spain, on 25 December 2004 with the participations of Real Madrid and Telemar Rio de Janeiro.

Final

December 25, 2004

|}

References

FIBA International Christmas Tournament
2004–05 in European basketball
2004–05 in Spanish basketball